Jan Azam (born 1 July 1924) was a Pakistani sports shooter. He competed in the 50 m rifle, prone event at the 1952 Summer Olympics.

References

External links

1924 births
Possibly living people
Pakistani male sport shooters
Olympic shooters of Pakistan
Shooters at the 1952 Summer Olympics
Place of birth missing